Megadiestramima is a genus of cave or camel crickets in the subfamily Aemodogryllinae and tribe Diestramimini.  Originating in Asia, species have been found in the Indo-China region.

Species
The Orthoptera Species File lists:
subgenus Leodiestramima Storozhenko, 2009
Megadiestramima exculta Gorochov, 1998
Megadiestramima lecta Gorochov, 1998
subgenus Megadiestramima Storozhenko & Gorochov, 1992
Megadiestramima abramovi Gorochov & Storozhenko, 2019
Megadiestramima bilobata Gorochov & Storozhenko, 2019
Megadiestramima borealis Gorochov & Storozhenko, 2019
Megadiestramima centralis Gorochov & Storozhenko, 2019
Megadiestramima darevskyi Gorochov, 1998
Megadiestramima extensa Gorochov, 1998
Megadiestramima intermedia Storozhenko & Gorochov, 1992 – type species
Megadiestramima vera Gorochov, 2002
subgenus Neodiestramima Gorochov & Storozhenko, 2019
Megadiestramima brevispina Gorochov & Storozhenko, 2019
Megadiestramima orlovi Gorochov, 1994

References 

Ensifera genera
Rhaphidophoridae
Orthoptera of Indo-China